Drzonowo Wałeckie  (formerly ) is a village in the administrative district of Gmina Człopa, within Wałcz County, West Pomeranian Voivodeship, in north-western Poland.

Before 1772 the area was part of Kingdom of Poland, 1772-1945 Prussia and Germany. For more on its history, see Wałcz County.

Notable residents
 Friedrich Foertsch (1900–1976), Inspector General of the Bundeswehr
 Hermann Foertsch (1895–1961), general

References

Villages in Wałcz County